Sir James Dowling (25 November 1787 – 27 September 1844) was an English-born Australian jurist in New South Wales, Chief Justice of New South Wales 1837 – 1844.

Early life
James Dowling was born in London, England, the son of Vincent Dowling of Queen's County, Ireland, and brother of Alfred Septimus Dowling. Educated at St Paul's School, he later became a parliamentary reporter, studied law and was called to the bar at the Middle Temple in May 1815. He edited the second edition of W. Paley's Law and Practice of Summary Convictions, and was also responsible for several volumes of Reports of Cases.

Career
Dowling applied to the Colonial Office for an appointment in June 1827 and on 6 August 1827 he was appointed third judge at Sydney, where he arrived in February 1828. He acted with consideration and tact over a question of precedence which immediately arose. Governor Ralph Darling held that the terms of his commission placed Dowling next in precedence to the chief justice, Francis Forbes, while John Stephen, the other judge, pointed out that in England such questions were decided by seniority. Dowling suggested that the matter should be referred to the home authorities, and that in the meantime Stephen should take precedence. The question was settled in favour of Stephen's view, and Dowling cheerfully accepted the position of junior judge. The state of Stephen's health, however, threw a good deal of work on the shoulders of Dowling, who also learned that in Sydney in those days a judge was constantly open to criticism. 

In June 1832, he found it necessary to defend his judgment in a particular case which had been criticized in letters printed in the Sydney Monitor, and was assured by Viscount Goderich that he would not permit himself "to entertain even a momentary impression to his prejudice". In December Stephen retired and Dowling became second judge. In January 1834, some remarks of Dowling's on the conduct of a criminal trial led to the three judges drawing up an important memorandum suggesting many possible improvements in dealing with criminal cases.

In September 1835, Dowling was appointed acting Chief Justice during the absence of Forbes, who was on leave. William Westbrooke Burton, the third judge, objected to this on the ground that his previous appointment as a judge at the Cape of Good Hope made him senior to Dowling. Dowling was an appointed member of the New South Wales Legislative Council from 19 April 1836 until 5 January 1843. 

In April 1837, Forbes retired from his office, and Dowling was appointed chief justice on 29 August 1837. John Walpole Willis arrived at Sydney in November 1837 to take the position of third judge; conflict between Willis and the Chief Justice reached such a level that for the sake of peace Governor Gipps transferred Willis to Melbourne in January 1841.

Following the brutal killing of 28 unarmed Aboriginal Australians in the Myall Creek massacre on 10 June 1838, Dowling presided over the first trial in which a jury acquitted eleven colonists of the murder of one person, referred to as Daddy. Dowling also sat in the Full Bench which determined questions of law following the conviction of seven colonists of the murder of two children and an adult referred to as Charley. In June 1843, Dowling expressed his willingness to act as speaker of the new Legislative Council, but Gipps ruled against this as he considered it would not be in the public interest. In August 1844 Dowling was granted 18 months leave of absence due to a breakdown in his health, but he died soon after on 27 September 1844.

Personal life
He was knighted in 1837. He was married twice and was survived by his second wife, Lady Harriott Dowling, and two sons and two daughters from his first marriage. A pension of £200 a year was granted to Lady Dowling. Lady Dowling was the eldest daughter of John Blaxland.

At the time of his death, Dowling was preparing a volume of law reports of the decisions of the Supreme Court of New South Wales. The volume was eventually published in 2005. Many of these cases are also online.

Dowling was regarded as a hard working judge, and rarely took holidays. One of his sons, James Sheen Dowling (1819–1902), was born in England and came to Australia with his father in 1828, practised as a barrister and was a District Court judge from 1858 to 1889 and an acting judge of the Supreme Court from 1878 to 1881.

South Dowling Street in Sydney is named after him.

See also
List of judges of the Supreme Court of New South Wales

References

Sources
T.D. Castle and Bruce Kercher (eds), Dowling's Select Cases, 1828 to 1844: Decisions of the Supreme Court of New South Wales (Francis Forbes Society for Australian Legal History, Sydney, 2005).

External links
Many of Dowling's cases and decisions are online at AustLii:
Decisions of the Superior Courts of New South Wales, 1788-1899
Superior Courts of New South Wales (pre-1900) Case Notes 

Chief Justices of New South Wales
Judges of the Supreme Court of New South Wales
1787 births
1844 deaths
Burials at Waverley Cemetery
People educated at St Paul's School, London
Colony of New South Wales judges
19th-century Australian judges
Members of the New South Wales Legislative Council
19th-century Australian politicians